Greenhill is a village in County Durham, England. It is situated a few miles south of Sunderland, and adjoins Murton.

Villages in County Durham
Murton, County Durham